Christian August Selmer (16 November 1816 – 1 September 1889) was a Norwegian  lawyer and a   magistrate. He  served as a member of the Norwegian Parliament, Minister of Defense  and Minister of Justice. He was the 2nd prime minister of Norway in Christiana between 1880 and 1884.

Background
Selmer  was born at Fredrikshald in Østfold, Norway and grew up in Halden. He was the son of Johan Christian Selmer (1783-1830) and Johanne Ditlevine Michea Vibe (1788-1879).  Selmer studied law  at the University of  Christiania from 1837, achieved his legal degree in 1842.
In 1842, he was magistrate  in Sør-Hedmark. In 1848, he was appointed law clerk in the office of attorney P.A. Midelfart in Drammen. In 1850, he took over the firm and developed an extensive legal practice. He served as a stipendiary magistrate in Drammen from 1862 until 1874.  In 1848 he married  Anna Sylvia Leganger (1825–1896).

Career
Selmer served as deputy to Parliament for Drammen from 1871 until 1873 and permanent representative from 1874 until 1876. In 1874 joined the cabinet of Prime Minister Frederik Stang. Following the surprising resignation of Frederik Stang  as Prime Minister in September 1880, King Oscar II of Sweden had Selmer in mind as Norwegian Prime Minister. Selmer's record as Prime Minister was characterized by conflict over whether members of the cabinet were required to appear in Parliament to answer questions.  He influenced King Oscar II to reject efforts at a compromise, setting the stage for impeachment proceedings. In April 1883 the members of the lower house (Odelsting)  decided to impeach the members of the Selmer  cabinet.  Selmer was subsequently convicted under articles of impeachment and  resigned as Prime Minister on  March 1, 1884.

Subsequently, Selmer became acting  General Auditor (Generalauditør) of the Royal Norwegian Army and Royal Norwegian Navy, He held this office until his death at Bygdøy in Aker during September 1889. He was buried at Vår Frelsers gravlund in Kristiania.

References

External links
Biography at the Norwegian National Government website

1816 births
1889 deaths
People from Halden
University of Oslo alumni
19th-century Norwegian lawyers
Prime Ministers of Norway
Government ministers of Norway
Presidents of the Norwegian Red Cross
Members of the Storting
19th-century Norwegian politicians
Burials at the Cemetery of Our Saviour
Ministers of Justice of Norway
Defence ministers of Norway